Ann Cary Randolph Morris (1774–1837) (nicknamed Nancy) was the daughter of Thomas Mann Randolph Sr. and the wife of Gouverneur Morris. Books have been written about the scandal in which she was embroiled in central Virginia as a young woman after the death of her fiance. After she married Gouverneur Morris in New York, she regained much of her favorable social prominence until he died in 1816. She was devoted to their son, Gouverneur Morris Jr. (1813–1888), whom she called her "richest treasure.” They lived at Morrisania (in what is now the Bronx). He had the St. Ann's Episcopal Church in Bronx built in her memory.

Early life

Ann Cary Randolph was born near Richmond, Virginia on the Tuckahoe Plantation. Her parents were Thomas Mann Randolph Sr. and Ann Cary Randolph, and she had 12 siblings. The aristocratic, plantation-owning Randolph family of Virginia, descended from William Randolph of Turkey Island, Virginia, and often intermarried among the First Families of Virginia.

During her childhood, she and her cousin Martha Jefferson Randolph were close friends. Her mother died in March 1789. In September of the following year, her father married a woman about Ann's age named Gabriela.

By the age of 16, Ann had a number of suitors. She was described as "by every indication a fetching girl with a 'little upturned nose,' a gift for self-dramatization, remarkably little in the way of discretion, and oodles of sex appeal." Ann and her stepmother fought and Ann was asked to leave the house.

Bizarre Plantation scandal
When she was about 19 years old, Ann went to live with her sister Judith and brother-in-law, Richard Randolph, at Bizarre Plantation, an Antebellum tobacco plantation at what would become the corner of East Second and North Main Streets in Farmville, Virginia. The couple, distant cousins, had married in 1789 when Richard (also a descendant of William Randolph), was 19 and Judith was 17. Richard and his brothers Theodorick Randolph and John Randolph of Roanoke lost their father in 1775, and three years later their mother married St. George Tucker, a prominent lawyer and future law professor at the College of William and Mary as well as Virginia appellate judge, so he helped raise the boys, including bringing them on trips to visit his planter father in Bermuda in order to improve their often-problematic health. Richard Randolph, the eldest and therefore heir to most of their late father's estate, had studied at Princeton as well as with noted Virginia jurist George Wythe (St. George Tucker's mentor and friend) before taking control of his late father's plantation. However, the tobacco economy was collapsing at the time.

Some later claimed that Ann and the married Richard were too fond of one another, and in the months after the early spring death of her fiance, Theodoric Randolph (an engagement Ann made against her father's wishes), particularly in the summer of 1792, Ann began gaining noticeable weight. On October 1 of the same year, Judith, Richard, and Ann traveled to the Glentivar (or Glenlyvar) estate 30 miles northeast of Farmville to visit their cousin Randolph Harrison and his wife, Mary. The following night, Ann had screamed, which awakened the Harrisons. A servant told Mary Harrison that Ann was sick and needed laudanum. Richard was in Ann's dark room and would not allow a candle to be brought in, but Mary Harrison was able to sit with Ann for a few minutes. Judith remained in bed in the room she was staying in. The next day, blood was found on Ann's pillowcases and on the stairs; her bedding had been removed; and she remained in her room. The Randolphs left the Harrisons’ estate at the end of the week. The Harrisons were later told that the plantation's enslaved people found the corpse of a baby in a pile of old shingles.

In April 1793, the local prosecutor accused Richard Randolph of murdering the baby born to Ann. Prominent lawyers John Marshall and Patrick Henry defended him before at a trial before the more than judges of the Prince Edward County Court. During the trial, Martha Jefferson Randolph stated that she had obtained gum guaicum, which she believed could be used to abort a baby, and had given it to Ann two weeks before the trip to Glentivar. Other people also testified during the trial that Ann had been pregnant. Enslaved people were precluded from testifying by Virginia law, so no evidence could be presented about the body found in the stack of shingles. Judith Randolph either did not testify or she testified that Richard did not leave their room that night. Richard Randolph was acquitted. Despite the acquittal, one modern author noted Ann faced severe consequences:"before the year was out, the girl [Ann] had become the Jezebel of the Old Dominion and the young man who was the alleged father [Richard] had become its laughing stock. Idlers in taverns made ribald jokes at his expense."

Thomas Jefferson, upon hearing of the scandal, wrote a letter to his daughter, Martha Jefferson Randolph. He wrote that he considered Ann "the pitiable victim" and encouraged his daughter to be a kind influence in her life. In fact, Ann had been engaged to Richard Randolph's brother, Theodoric, who had died eight months before the stillbirth. Jefferson stated that he only found one person guilty. 

Martha responded that the "vile seducer" had both destroyed Ann’s reputation and corrupted her mind, and she was concerned that some people may be swayed from what a "person of sense" would deduce about the scandal.

After Richard Randolph died mysteriously in 1796 (leaving behind a will which scandalized many because it manumitted his slaves, a direction Judith Randolph fought for years to implement), Ann continued to live at the Bizarre plantation for a time. Despite knowing of Theodorick's engagement with Ann and his death, Richard's other brother, John Randolph of Roanoke, thought that Ann had poisoned Richard, and Judith was angry about the earlier scandal as well as upset by losing her husband and having a guardian appointed for her underage sons. In 1805, John asked Ann to leave the plantation. She spent the first couple of nights in the abandoned Tuckahoe mansion, then lived with various friends; at Monticello with her brother Thomas Mann Randolph Jr. (who had since married their cousin, Martha Jefferson Randolph); as well as in Richmond, Rhode Island, and Connecticut. She had very limited means, at times receiving small sums of money from her brothers, and she may have taught school in Rhode Island.

Marriage

Ann was living in a boarding house in New York in October 1808 when she received a visit from Gouverneur Morris, whom she had first met when he visited Tuckahoe Plantation around 1788. After corresponding for awhile, she accepted a position as his housekeeper. Morris was a senator for New York, a delegate to both the Continental Congress and the Constitutional Convention, and an ambassador to France under President Washington. In April 1809, she went to work and live in New York at his residence, Morrisania. As a surprise to Morrisania guests, they were married on Christmas Day in 1809, with Ann’s plain, worn housekeeping dress serving as her wedding gown. Kirschke states, "Her wedding dress was a statement that they both very much enjoyed, Nancy [Ann] because it showed her gratitude for his past kindness and Morris likely because of the element of surprise for the guests." 

Ann’s marriage to a prestigious figure allowed her to move on from her dismal years and regain social prominence. From June to September in 1810, the newlywed couple traveled to inspect the land for the Erie Canal. In December 1811, they were guests at the White House, where they met with President James Madison and First Lady Dolley Madison and socialized with political and diplomatic figures. In 1815, Ann recommended Samuel Larned as consul at Gibraltar in a letter to President Madison. Larned went on to have a 23-year career in diplomatic service.

[[File:Gouverneur Morris II (1813-1888), American railroad executive.jpg|thumb|left|Thomas Seir Cummings, Gouverneur Morris Jr. (1813-1888), 1840, Walters Art Museum.]]
The couple had one child, Gouverneur Morris Jr., in 1813. In October 1813, Gouverneur was away from his wife and baby and wrote a poem for her in a letter. After he returned home, the couple spent only one other night apart. Ann had the poem published posthumously in the alumni magazine The Columbian.  

Ann maintained relationships with family members and friends in Virginia, which included her sister Judith and Judith’s sons, who had become the wards of the childless, unmarried John Randolph of Roanoke. Tudor Randolph, her younger son, attended Harvard University in 1814 and became seriously ill with tuberculosis. Ann took him in at the Morrisania mansion and cared for him for three months. Judith and John visited Morrisania during Tudor's convalescence. In the hope that a change in climate would help him improve his health, Tudor traveled to England, but he died there in August 1815. Judith died in 1816. 

Previously, on his way home to Virginia from his visit to Morrisania, John Randolph wrote a "vitriolic" letter to Ann, who then wrote a long response to twenty of John's political opponents. Throughout the years, John Randolph attempted to keep the Bizarre Plantation scandal alive, and Ann heard unflattering rumors about herself throughout New York. The animus toward her extended to relatives of Gouverneur Morris, who were no longer heirs to Morris’s estate because of his marriage to Ann and the birth of their son.

Gouverneur Morris died on November 6, 1816 at Morrisania. Ann and her son continued to live at Morrisania until her death in 1837. Ann considered her son her "richest treasure" and focused much of her attention on ensuring that he received a good education. Her son became a railroad executive and was one of the founders of the Republican Party. He married his cousin, Martha "Patsey" Jefferson Cary, the daughter of Ann's younger sister Virginia Randolph Cary. 

She fought rumors of her in-laws that her son was not a son of Gouverneur Morris. She used the press, friend's advice, and attorneys to address claims against her and her husband's character. Her efforts, and those of her husband's before he died, did much to restore her reputation. She also managed her husband's estate, which was diminished due to mismanagement by one of his nephews, so that her son would inherit an "unencumbered estate". 

Ann died in 1837. In her memory, her son built the St. Ann's Episcopal Church along the Harlem River on the grounds of Morrisania.
 

Ann and Gouverneur Morris are buried in a family crypt at St. Ann's.

Notes

References

Further reading
 Anderson, Jefferson Randolph. (1937). "Tuckahoe and the Tuckahoe Randolphs." The Virginia Magazine of History and Biography, 45(1), 55-86. Retrieved January 14, 2020, from www.jstor.org/stable/4244772
 Crawford, Alan Pell. Unwise Passions: A True Story of a Remarkable Woman - and the First Great Scandal of Eighteenth-Century America. New York: Simon & Schuster, 2000.
 Doyle, Christopher L.  "The Randolph Scandal in Early National Virginia, 1792-1815: New Voices in the 'Court of Honour'."  Journal of Southern History 69, no. 2 (2003): 283-318.
 Kierner, Cynthia A. Scandal at Bizarre: Rumor and Reputation in Jefferson's America.'' New York: Palgrave Macmillan, 2004.
 
 Nancy Randolph Papers, 1805-1962, Special Collections Research Center, Earl Gregg Swem Library, College of William and Mary.

1774 births
1837 deaths
Randolph family of Virginia
Morris family (Morrisania and New Jersey)
People from Virginia
American people of Powhatan descent